The Polish Coastal Landscape Park (Nadmorski Park Krajobrazowy) is a protected area (Landscape Park) in northern Poland, established in 1978, covering an area of .

The Park lies within Pomeranian Voivodeship, in Puck County (Gmina Kosakowo, Gmina Krokowa, Gmina Puck).

Within the Landscape Park are nine nature reserves.

In the Coastal Landscape Park there are all types of coast typical of the southern Baltic Sea. A characteristic element here are bogs, including the easternmost, Atlantic-type raised bogs. Almost half of the park is covered with forests, especially pine trees. There is a beech reserve on Cape Rozewie.

The fauna includes birds such as gulls, buzzards, ruffs. The coastal waters are rich in algae, crustaceans and molluscs. There are also many species of fish: stickleback, roach, perch, eel. Puck Bay is a reservoir for grey seals. It can also be seen in the Seal Sanctuary in Hel.

References 

Coastal
Parks in Pomeranian Voivodeship
Puck County